Ricardo Alberto Lombana González (born 26 November 1973 in Panama City) is a Panamanian lawyer and politician. He ran for the presidency in the 2019 Panamanian general election as an independent candidate receiving 18.78% of the vote.

Biography
Lombana was born in Panama City. His father, Roberto Lombana, is a native of Proaza, Asturias, Spain and he is the great-nephew of Clara González, founder of the National Feminist Party of Panama in the 1920s and the first Panamanian female lawyer.

He studied at the Lasallian school of Colegio De La Salle in Panama City  after which he attended the University of Panama, where he obtained a law degree in 1998. Two years later, in 2000, he moved to Washington, D.C., where he obtained a master's degree in International and Comparative Law at George Washington University. He then went on to study International Human Rights Law at the University of Oxford, and International Economic Policy, Securities and Tax Law at Harvard University.

Following his studies in 2002, he was appointed special delegate for freedom of expression in the Ombudsman's Office before working in the Panamanian embassy in Washington, D.C., as Minister Counsellor first followed by being appointed counsul general from 1 September 2004 – 19 March 2007. He also worked at the newspaper La Prensa as chief of information and then editorial deputy director. In 2008 Lombana became a lawyer as part of the law firm Galindo, Arias & López, until in 2013 he founded his own law firm Lombana Law & Media.

Lombana also ran an anti-corruption campaign called "‘Juego Limpio Panamá" (Play Fair Panama).

In 2017, he announced his intention to run as an Independent for President in the May 2019 election. On 24 December 2018, Lombana chose the former magistrate of the Electoral Tribunal, Guillermo Márquez Amado, as his running mate. After obtaining 108,492 signatures Lombana was accepted as a candidate. His campaign called for austerity, a new constitution, anti-corruption measures, social security reforms and immigration control.

In the election he came third with 18.78% of the vote. He announced that he would run again in the 2024 election and as his first step he announced the creation of the Movimiento Otro Camino political party.

References

1973 births
Living people
Panamanian politicians
People from Panama City